

Disease associations
A significant association has been found between A74 and nasal polyposis.

Allele distribution

Sources

References

7